William the Outlaw is the seventh book in the Just William series by Richmal Crompton. It was first published in 1927.

Stories
William the Outlaw—The Outlaws receive an unwanted lecture on geology.
The Terrible Magician—The Outlaws believe that Mr. Galileo Simkins, a harmless amateur scientist, is really an evil sorcerer.
Georgie and the Outlaws—The Outlaws' parents discover there is such a thing as a perfect child.
William Plays Santa Claus—William is given the task of distributing Christmas presents at two separate parties.
William and the White Elephants—The literal-minded William is thrilled to be put in charge of a white elephant stall - until he learns what a "white elephant" actually is.
Finding a School for William—Horrified that Mr Cranthorpe-Cranborough, a headmaster, intends to send him away to his boarding school, William sets out to sabotage the plan.
The Stolen Whistle—William annoys the entire neighborhood with his new dog-whistle.
William Finds a Job—Robert has fallen in love with the daughter of an artist—a fact which William ruthlessly exploits.
William's Busy Day—A caving expedition leads William into strange territory.
William is Hypnotised—William takes revenge on the school sneak.

References

1927 short story collections
Just William
Short story collections by Richmal Crompton
Children's short story collections
1927 children's books
George Newnes Ltd books